Alexander Young, VC (27 January 1873 – 19 October 1916) was an Irish-born South African soldier and a recipient of the Victoria Cross, the highest award for gallantry in the face of the enemy that can be awarded to British and Commonwealth forces.

A native of Oranmore, County Galway, Young joined the Queen's Bays on 22 May 1890 at Renmore. He served for a time in India, and became a riding instructor. He first saw active service in the Mahdist War, Second Boer War, and First World War.

VC details
Young was 28 years old and a sergeant-major in the Cape Police, South African Forces during the Second Boer War when the following deed took place for which he was awarded the VC.

First World War
Young served with the South African Scottish Regiment with the rank of lieutenant in the First World War. He was killed in action during the Battle of the Somme on 19 October 1916. His name is included on a list of war dead in St. Nicholas's church, Galway.

The medal
Young's Victoria Cross is held in Lord Ashcroft's VC collection.

References

1873 births
1916 deaths
19th-century Irish people
Irish recipients of the Victoria Cross
South African recipients of the Victoria Cross
Second Boer War recipients of the Victoria Cross
British Army personnel of the Mahdist War
South African military personnel killed in World War I
2nd Dragoon Guards (Queen's Bays) soldiers
People from County Galway
South African Army officers
Military personnel from County Galway